The Port Jefferson Branch is a rail line and service owned and operated by the Long Island Rail Road in the U.S. state of New York. The branch splits from the Main Line just east of Hicksville and runs northeast and east to Port Jefferson. Several stations on the Main Line west of Hicksville are served primarily by trains bound to/from the Port Jefferson branch, so LIRR maps and schedules for the public include that part of the Main Line in the "Port Jefferson Branch" service.

The Port Jefferson Branch is one of the busiest branches of the LIRR, with frequent electric service to Huntington where electrification ends, and diesel service east of Huntington continuing to Port Jefferson. The MTA also refers to the line as the "Huntington/Port Jefferson Branch" or "Huntington Branch".

Service
Port Jefferson Branch service (as distinct from the physical trackage called the Port Jefferson Branch) extends east from Floral Park, where the Hempstead Branch separates from the Main Line. The line west of Huntington is electrified and double tracked. Electrification extends east of Huntington, past a layup track used to store electric trains, to a point between the Park Avenue and Lake Road grade crossings. East of there, the line is single-track, with a double-ended freight siding at Greenlawn, an interlocked passing siding east of Northport, and further interlocked sidings at Kings Park, Smithtown and Stony Brook passenger stations, allowing trains traveling in opposite directions to pass each other.

Electric trains on the branch operate between Manhattan (Penn Station or Grand Central) and Huntington, providing local service on the branch. Trains to the Ronkonkoma Branch provide supplemental service; these usually run express, stopping only at Mineola and/or Hicksville. Additional service to Mineola is provided by Oyster Bay Branch trains, and a handful of Montauk Branch trains also stop at Mineola and Hicksville on weekdays, though the vast majority of Montauk Branch trains that run on the Main Line do not stop. Service on the non-electrified portion of the branch between Port Jefferson and Huntington is usually provided by diesel shuttles; transfers generally occur at Huntington between diesel shuttles and electric trains to/from city terminals. During rush hours, the branch sees extra service, including direct service between stations east of Huntington and Hunterspoint Avenue, Long Island City, or Penn Station.

Stations on the electrified portion that have the heaviest traffic include Mineola (Main Line), Hicksville (Main Line), and Huntington. On the non-electrified portion, the heaviest traffic tends to be to the Stony Brook station where Stony Brook University is located.

Infrastructure improvements

New electric yard
Lacking a yard to store its electric trains, the branch has storage space for just three 12-car electric trainsets (at the South Side track extension east of Huntington). A new yard for electric trains would resolve this inefficiency and allow more frequent service on the branch.

In the early 2000s, the MTA performed environmental studies for over a dozen potential sites for a yard between Huntington and Smithtown. Sites beyond Huntington would require extending the electrical infrastructure, which adds expense.

Communities near the sites opposed the MTA's efforts to advance work on a new yard, arguing that the MTA was too secretive and that the increased train service and train movements would hurt their communities and decrease their quality of life. One commenter asserted that a yard would turn the communities along the line into the MTA's "storage closet" for East Side Access. Other opponents of the plan argued that the MTA should extend electrification to Port Jefferson and use its existing diesel rail yard.

The MTA budgeted $8 million in its 2015–2019 Capital Program for environmental studies, design work, and land acquisition for a new electric yard. (Construction would be funded in a future Capital Program.) , the MTA was also considering other options, including extending electrification and/or a second track from Huntington to Port Jefferson.

In February 2022, local leaders urged the MTA to consider a Superfund site near the Port Jefferson Station—the former Lawrence Aviation Industries site—for the electric storage yard, as well as extending electrification from Huntington to Port Jefferson. The MTA has not moved forward with this plan or any others.

History
The line from Hicksville to Syosset was chartered in 1853 as the Hicksville and Syosset Railroad and opened in 1854. The LIRR later planned to extend to Cold Spring Harbor, but Oliver Charlick, the LIRR's president, disagreed over the station's location, so Charlick abandoned the grade and relocated the extension south of Cold Spring, refusing to add a station stop near Cold Spring for years. Another argument at Huntington led to the line bypassing the town two miles (3 km) to the south, though a station was built. The line was extended from Syosset past Huntington to Northport in 1868, and in 1873 the 1870-chartered Smithtown and Port Jefferson Railroad opened from a mile south of Northport to Port Jefferson, turning the old line into Northport into the Northport Branch, the result of another argument between Charlick and Northport.

The Port Jefferson Branch was extended to Wading River in 1895, and became known as the Wading River Branch. The line was once slated to continue eastward and rejoin the Main Line at either Riverhead or Calverton. From 1905 to 1928, Wading River was also the site of an LIRR demonstration farm. The other one was east of Medford station on the Main Line.

The grade crossing with New York Avenue in Huntington was eliminated in 1909 as that road was lowered below grade. In 1910 and 1911 work was undertaken to reduce grades and eliminate sharp curves along the line between Syosset and Huntington. In 1911, the line's second track was extended from Hicksville to Cold Spring. In 1985, the second track was extended from just east of Syosset to just west of Huntington to alleviate a single-track bottleneck.

The line east of Port Jefferson was abandoned in 1938. The right-of-way is now owned by the Long Island Power Authority and used for power lines, and an additional parallel rail trail for bicycling, running, and walking is being built out, though as of August 2021 it was not yet officially open. Expected completion is in the fall of 2021. The Port Jefferson Branch was electrified from Mineola to Huntington Station in 1970. The former Northport Branch was abandoned in 1985, and the Kings Park Psychiatric Center spur (see below) was abandoned in 1988.

Kings Park Psychiatric Center Spur

Kings Park Psychiatric run-off also known as KPPC is an abandoned spur off the Port Jefferson Branch for the Kings Park Psychiatric Center. This spur started just west of Kings Park station, ran north of the station house, crossed Indian Head Road (Suffolk CR 14) and then curved north to cross New York State Route 25A, where it ran along the western edge of the hospital property, and ended at the Hospital's coal power plant.

This spur was first used in 1896 for coal and passenger use on Sundays. The route was the second largest spur in the Long Island Rail Road system when it was first completed. The route came to an end during the late 1980s. Nowadays, this abandoned route is a right-of-way for biking and is open to the public today. Also, today, only small fragments of rail remain as it most of it was removed during the demise of the complex.

Electrification
On October 19, 1970, electrification was extended  from Mineola to Huntington, the eastern limit of electrification on the branch. This was the first major LIRR electrification project since the electrification of the Babylon Branch in 1925 between Lynbrook and Babylon. The project was completed for $69 million, and received funding from a 1967 state transportation bond issue and the United States Department of Transportation. With the completion of electrification to Huntington, six trains would run from electric territory on the branch in the morning, and five would return in the evening, providing direct service to Brooklyn and Penn Station without a change at Jamaica.

Since then, the LIRR has aspired to extend electrification beyond Huntington. In the 1980s, the railroad prepared to extend electrification to at least Northport, or Smithtown, although electrification of the Ronkonkoma Branch on the Main Line was seen as a higher priority, in part because the Main Line's central location in Suffolk County would benefit a larger number of people.

In December 1983, the LIRR announced that it was taking steps in the electrification of the branch, with the first step being the addition of a second electrified track from Syosset to Huntington. The second built along the south side of the existing track. The second track was expected to be open in 1986. In August 1983, Long Island Lighting Company started relocating its power line along the right-of-way between these points. The following month a contract to prepare the site and to construct the roadbed for the track was awarded for $9.5 million. In December 1983, grading and construction work was expected to begin that month, and track installation was scheduled to be completed by the end of 1985. The design of the project to Northport was completed, and preliminary designs were expected to be completed by early 1984.

On August 6, 1984, a groundbreaking ceremony was held at Kings Park station for the inauguration of a project to install high-level platforms at that station in preparation of the electrification of the line from Huntington to Smithtown. Kings Park would receive high-level platforms first, with Greenlawn, Northport, and Smithtown also slated to receive them. Work was to be completed in two phases. In the first phase, expected to be completed by the end of 1984, six-car high-level platforms would be installed. These platforms would be extended to accommodate twelve-car trains in the second phase, to be done by the middle of 1985.

Bruce McIver, president of the LIRR at the time, estimated in 1986 that electrification of the branch would cost $320 million, including new rolling stock. He argued that the limited funds the railroad had set aside for electrification would be better spent on other improvements, such as signal and yard upgrades near Penn Station. Financial constraints acted as another obstacle to electrification to Northport. McIver also did not want to electrify the branch in a piecemeal fashion and wanted to wait until the railroad had the funds to electrify from Huntington to Port Jefferson all at once. In anticipation of electrification, from late 1985 to early 1986, the LIRR built full-length high-level platforms at all stations between Huntington and Port Jefferson. Because electrification has not occurred, these 12-car platforms are unique in the LIRR's diesel territory; the high-level platforms along the Montauk, Greenport and Oyster Bay diesel branches are all much shorter. Work to install centralized traffic control between Smithtown and Port Jefferson started in fall 1974 and was completed in March 1975. This project was intended to improve safety and to increase train speed. The change allowed bidirectional service in single-track territory with the use of passing sidings.

On June 9, 1986, double-tracking of the line between Syosset and Huntington was completed, and seven additional trains (two diesels and five electric) were added to the schedule. The second track sped some trips by up to 15 minutes, and increased operational flexibility. The $41 million project started in September 1983 and included the widening of bridges at West Rogues Path and Woodbury Road, five rubberized grade crossings, and the installation of a six-car length platform on the new second track at Cold Spring Harbor. Construction for the project required off-peak service outages starting in June 1985, and its completion was delayed from fall 1985 due to delays in property acquisition in Cold Spring Harbor.

Instead of electrification, the LIRR ultimately pursued dual-mode locomotives that could switch between diesel power and electric power to serve Penn Station (where diesel emissions are banned). Senator Norman Levy said that "The people who ride the line would have just about all the positive aspects of electrification with this proposal." The LIRR's dual-mode locomotives debuted in the late 1990s, providing two round trips during weekday rush hours between Penn Station and Port Jefferson, the first time a one-seat ride was available.

Proposed electrification extension
In 2015, multiple parties renewed calls for electrification of the branch. The LIRR estimated that electrification would cost up to $18 million per track mile, so electrification of the 23 miles from Huntington to Port Jefferson could cost approximately $414 million. In its 20-Year Needs Assessment, the agency lists electrification eastward as a long-term goal.

In September 2018, LIRR President Phillip Eng said the LIRR is still exploring the possibility of electrifying the remaining section of track between Huntington and Port Jefferson.

Grade crossing eliminations
The Port Jefferson Branch and Main Line also been known to have the most hazardous grade crossings in the country. On April 28, 1998, a bridge over Herricks Road opened, replacing a grade crossing which was once "labeled the most hazardous in the United States by the National Transportation Safety Board." The grade-crossing elimination project was initiated after an incident on March 14, 1982, when a van with ten teenagers got struck at the four-lane wide rail crossing with the crossing gates down, killing nine of them. The project took five years and cost $85 million. Work continued for a year to widen the overpass to allow for a future third track.

Other crossings eliminated along the branch include Mineola Boulevard in Mineola (1930), crossings within Hicksville when the station was elevated in the early 1960s, and Charlotte Avenue  in Hicksville (1973). Ten years later in 2008, the four-lane wide Roslyn Road in Mineola was eliminated in the same fashion. Several hazardous crossings still exist west of Huntington east of DIVIDE interlocking, such as Robbins Lane and Jackson Avenue in Syosset. East of Huntington, Park Avenue in Huntington and Main Street in Port Jefferson are considered quite hazardous.

The Third Track project closed the seven remaining grade crossings on the Main Line, namely those in Westbury, Mineola, and New Hyde Park. The first two crossings that underwent elimination would be Urban Avenue in Westbury and Covert Avenue in New Hyde Park. Construction to eliminate began from February–April 2019 with the closures of both roads. On the weekend of July 20–21, 2019, the trestle that will carry the three tracks was installed at Urban Avenue. After construction of retaining walls, pedestrian walkway, and the repaving of the road, Urban Avenue was officially reopened on September 5, 2019. Covert Avenue underwent the installation of a three-track trestle on the weekend of August 24–25 and reopened on October 12th, 2019. New Hyde Park underwent the installation of a three-track trestle on the weekend of July 11–12, 2020, and reopened in August 2020. By mid-2021, Main Street in Mineola, the pedestrian crossing at Mineola's station, and 12th Street in New Hyde Park will be permanently closed to pedestrian and vehicular traffic, while Willis Avenue in Mineola and School Street in Westbury will receive trestles, with the roads crossing underneath. From May 2020 to November 2020, School Street underwent elimination and reopened less than two years after a violent accident involving a pick-up and two trains. On October 24, 2020, New Hyde Park officially was grade-separated when 12th Street was closed permanently. As of late 2020, the only grade crossings in between Hicksville and Floral Park are located in Mineola. In November 2020, Willis Avenue's elimination project began that will see both its Main Line and Oyster Bay Branch crossings eliminated with the road going underneath the tracks. Main Street and the pedestrian crossing will be removed shortly afterwards. After the Third Track Project is completed there will be no grade crossings from Hicksville Westward, noise from horns will be reduced to the benefit of residents along the tracks, and carbon emissions from idling vehicles will be eliminated. The elimination and reopening of Willis Avenue on September 3, 2021 officially marked the completion of the grade crossing elimination aspect of the Third Track Project, and the branch being fully grade-separated west of Hicksville.

Stations

Bibliography

References

External links

NYCSubway.org Port Jefferson Line
Wading River Branch (Arrt's Arrchives)
Port Jefferson Branch (The LIRR Today)

Long Island Rail Road branches
Transportation in Nassau County, New York
Transportation in Suffolk County, New York
1854 establishments in New York (state)